Zagava, initially established as Antiquariat Bücherwelten in 2002, is a German imprint from Düsseldorf that publishes genre-defying literature with an emphasis on weird fiction, strange tales and novels, supernatural and horror literature in limited editions. Although based in Germany all of Zagava′s books are in the English language. Most of Zagava's books are issued in standard limited and numbered hardbound versions and frequently in additional special lettered subeditions with special bindings or additional extras. The books are as much about their contents as about the art of fine book-production. Jonas Ploeger is the proprietor of this press.

Collections 
The press has published several story collections and novels as first editions by contemporary writers as Reggie Oliver, Mark Valentine and Quentin S. Crisp. Four collections of essays and stories have been published so far. "Transactions by the Flesh" (2013) is homage to Joris-Karl Huysmans with texts by Jonathan Wood, John Howard, Douglas Thompson, Derek John, Berit Ellingsen, Adam Golaski, Peter Holman, Eugene Thacker, Louis Marvick, M.O.N., Mark Valentine, Jeremy Reed, Oliver Smith, Colin Insole, Charles Schneider, D.P.Watt and Adam S. Cantwell. "Infra noir" (2014) collects texts by Mark Valentine, Thomas Stromsholt, John Howard, Damian Murphy and Colin Insole. "Dreams of Ourselves" (2014) collects stories in praise of Fernando Pessoa by Quentin S. Crisp, Jonathan Wood, Colin Insole, Andrew Condous, Mark Valentine, Damian Murphy, John Howard, Adam S. Cantwell, D.P.Watt and Avalon Brantley. It contains illustrations by Richard Skelton.

"Booklore" (2016) with texts by Quentin S. Crisp, Jonathan Wood, Colin Insole, Andrew Condous, Mark Valentine, Damian Murphy, John Howard, D.P.Watt and Avalon Brantley, Carl Abrahamsson, Avalon Brantley, Brian Catling , Andrew Condous, Brendan Connell, Quentin S. Crisp, Richard Gavin, Martin Hayes, Colin Insole, Timothy J. Jarvis, Andrew Liles , Chris Mikul, Daniel Mills, Damian Murphy, Reggie Oliver, Thomas Phillips, R. B. Russell, Michael Siefener, Charles Schneider, Thomas Stromsholt, Supervert, Mark Valentine, Paul Wallfisch, DP Watt, Ron Weighell and Jonathan Wood. It was illustrated by Erika Seguín Colás. In 2018, "Infra-Noir" a literary gazette printed on newspaper paper was introduced. The first issue featured texts by Brian Howell, Thomas Strømsholt, Alcebiades Diniz, Chris Mikul, Avalon Brantley, Jonathan Wood, Luiz Nazario and Nigel Humphreys, the second issue features texts by Louis Marvick, Forrest Aguirre, Reggie Oliver, Timothy Jarvis and many more.

Bibliography 

 2013: "Virtue in Danger" by Reggie Oliver (Zagava Ex Occidente Press)
 2013: "Transactions by the Flesh" edited by D.P. Watt and Peter Holman (Zagava Ex Occidente Press)
 2014: "Letters from Oblivion" by Andrew Condous (Zagava Ex Occidente Press) ISBN 978- 3- 9816093-8-7
 2014: "Malingerer" by Thomas Phillips (Zagava Ex Occidente Press) ISBN 978- 3- 9816093-5-6
 2014: "Descended Suns Resuscitate" by Avalon Brantley (Zagava Ex Occidente Press) 
 2014: "The Stream and the Torrent" by Brian Howell (Zagava Ex Occidente Press) 
 2014: "Infra Noir" edited by D.T. Ghetu  (Zagava Ex Occidente Press)  
 2014: "A Distillate of Heresy" by Damian Murphy (Zagava Ex Occidente Press) 
 2014: "Dreams of Ourselves" edited by Adolph Moscow aka Dan Ghetu (Zagava Ex Occidente Press) 
 2014: "Wraiths" by Mark Valentine (Zagava Ex Occidente Press)
 2015: "Cannibals of West Papua" by Brendan Connell (Zagava) 
 2015: "Erith" by Quentin S. Crisp (Zagava)  
 2015: "Wraiths" by Mark Valentine (Zagava) 2nd edition 
 2016: "Booklore" edited by Alcebiades Diniz (Zagava) 
 2016: "The Haunting at Tankerton Park" by Reggie Oliver (Zagava) 
 2017: "Der Orchideengarten", translated by Helen Grant (Zagava)  
 2017: "The House of Silence" by Avalon Brantley (Zagava)  
 2017: "In This Glasshouse" by Thomas Phillips (Zagava) 
 2017: "The Curious Case of Jan Torrentius" by Brian Howell (Zagava)
 2017: "The Sketchbook of Stanislav Szukalski" by Stanislav Szukalski, edited by Jonas Ploeger (Zagava) 
 2017: "The Prozess Manifestations" by Mark Samuels (Zagava) 
 2018: "The Irregular Casebook of Sherlock Holmes" by Ron Weighell (Zagava) 
 2018: "The Uncertainty of all Earthly Things" by Mark Valentine (Zagava) 
 2018: "The Feathered Bough" by Stephen J. Clark (Zagava) 
 2018: "Bandit Poet" by Jeremy Reed (Zagava) 
 2018: "The Bellboy" by Rebecca Lloyd (Zagava) 
 2018: "The Suicide Machine" by Douglas Thompson (Zagava) 
 2018: "And The Darkness Back Again" by Thomas Phillips (Zagava) 
 2018: "The Friendly Examiner - Episode 1" by Louis Marvick (Zagava) 
 2018: "Her Friends" by S. Cohen (Zagava) 
 2019: "The Delicate Shoreline Beckons Us" by Jonathan Wood, introduction by Mark Valentine (Zagava) 
 2019: "Alraune des Jugendstils - Ilna Ewers Wunderwald" by Sven Brömsel (Zagava) 
 2019: "Art Noveau Mandrake", translated by James Conway (Zagava) 
 2019: "The Friendly Examiner - Episode 2" by Louis Marvick (Zagava)

References

External links 
 
 
 Zagava on YouTube
 Zagava on Instagram

German speculative fiction publishers
Small press publishing companies
Horror book publishing companies
Publishing companies established in 2002